Online chess is chess that is played over the Internet, allowing players to play against each other in real time. This is done through the use of Internet chess servers, which often include a system to pair up individual players based on their rating using an Elo or similar chess rating system. Online chess has existed since the 1970s, but has seen a rapid growth in popularity amidst the COVID-19 pandemic and rise of chess livestreaming.

History

Origins
Online chess has existed in various forms including PLATO and play-by-email since the dawn of the Internet in the 1970s. The first Internet server designed for online chess was the Internet Chess Club (known at the time as ICS), which started operation in 1992. The first chess website, which allowed playing through a graphical interface, was Caissa.com (known at the time as Caissa's Web) which launched in 1995. Since then, a number of chess websites have been developed. These include Chess.com, Lichess, and chess24, which are the largest chess websites as of 2021.

Growth
Online chess saw a spike in growth during the quarantines of the COVID-19 pandemic. This was due to both isolation and the popularity of Netflix miniseries The Queen's Gambit, which was released in October 2020. Chess app downloads on the App Store and Google Play Store rose by 63% after the show debuted. Chess.com saw more than twice as many account registrations in November as it had in previous months, and the number of games played monthly on Lichess doubled as well. There was also a demographic shift in players, with female registration on Chess.com shifting from 22% of new players to 27% of new players. Grandmaster Maurice Ashley said "A boom is taking place in chess like we have never seen maybe since the Bobby Fischer days," attributing the growth to an increased desire to do something constructive during the pandemic. USCF Women's Program Director Jennifer Shahade stated that chess works well on the Internet, since pieces do not need to be reset and matchmaking is virtually instant.

Streaming 
Online chess livestreaming also saw a surge amidst the pandemic. Players like Hikaru Nakamura, Daniel Naroditsky, and Levy Rozman along with many others streamed chess via Twitch, with more than 41 million hours of chess being watched total on the platform from March to August 2020. Chess.com teamed up with high-level chess streamers to organize PogChamps, an amateur tournament contested between popular Internet personalities that was streamed on Twitch and at one point became the top-viewed stream on the platform.

Operation

Rating system
Chess websites pair players based on a chess rating system; after a game ends, ratings are updated immediately and players may search for a new game using their updated ratings. The Internet Chess Club and Chess24.com use the Elo rating system, while Lichess and Chess.com use the Glicko rating system, which is a modern and more complex version of Elo.

Speed
Over-the-board (OTB) chess is traditionally played with a slow time control, meaning players are allowed more time to consider moves. Online chess is often played faster, with 93.8% of live chess games on Chess.com being played with a time control of 10 minutes per side or faster. International Master Anna Rudolf said that "online chess' shift to speed chess has brought excitement to the game."

Premove

A premove is an instruction given by a player to a chess program to make a certain move on a following turn if possible. Premoving is a feature exclusive to online chess. It is offered by many chess websites, including the Internet Chess Club, the Free Internet Chess Server, Chess.com, and Lichess. Chess.com allows players to make multiple premoves at once. The Internet Chess Club allows one to block players who use premoves.

There is some amount of strategy involved when premoving. Generally, premoves should only be used when the chosen move would be a good move in any subsequent position where it would be valid, such as if it is a response to a potential capture by one's opponent. Premoves may also be useful in extreme time trouble to avoid running out of time.

Cheating
Online cheating is an issue that has had a large effect on all levels of play. This is usually achieved by using a chess engine to get the best moves in a given position, though it can take other forms including sandbagging and rating manipulation. Chess.com stated in August 2020 that they were closing roughly 500 accounts each day due to cheating, some of whom were Grandmasters and titled players.

High-level chess tournaments were largely forced online during the COVID-19 pandemic, including the FIDE Online Nations Cup and the Magnus Carlsen Chess Tour. These were played on websites like Chess.com and chess24, but enforced additional rules on webcam usage and screen sharing in order to prevent cheating. Some tournaments also disallowed leaving the computer for breaks or to walk around, which would usually be allowed in an in-person tournament.

See also

 Internet chess server
 List of Internet chess servers
 Computer chess
 PyChess
 Correspondence chess

References

Chess
Online games